Helix Sleep is a privately held, U.S.-based, e-commerce brand platform, operating a portfolio of home goods brands. The company is headquartered in New York City. All mattresses and sofas are manufactured in the US, and the company ships product to the United States and Canada.

History 
Helix Sleep was founded by Jerry Lin, Kristian von Rickenbach, and Adam Tishman in 2015. The co-founders met at the University of Pennsylvania Wharton School MBA program. They bonded over the transition of moving to a new city and the struggles of buying a new mattress. They discovered that the mattress industry was broken, and they wanted to fix it. On August 4, 2015, the Helix Sleep website was launched. Prior to the launch, the company raised a seed round investment from angel investors.

The company expanded its delivery service to reach customers in Canada in January 2016. 

Helix Sleep announced that it had to raise Series A funding in August 2016. Investors included Double J Capital, Great Oaks VC, Simon Venture Group, WIT, Jonathan Klein, and Jess Itzler. 

The company launched the Birch by Helix brand in May 2019. The Allform brand was launched in May 2020.

Products 
The Helix Sleep brand gives customers a questionnaire to learn about their height and weight, how they sleep, and how firm their mattresses usually are and uses that data to match users to the perfect mattress.

See also 
Memory foam
Microcoil
Polyform

References

Companies based in New York City
Retail companies established in 2015
Mattress retailers of the United States